Duke Huan of Zheng, was the founder of the state of Zheng during the early Zhou Dynasty of ancient China. According to the Records of the Grand Historian, he was the son of King Li of Zhou . His ancestral name was Ji (姬), given name You (友), and Duke Huan was his posthumous name.

In 806 BC, he was bestowed the land of Zheng (northwest of modern Hua County, Shaanxi) by King Xuan of Zhou. In 773 BC, the 33rd year of the reign of Duan Huan of Zheng, King You of Zhou gave him the position of situ (Minister of Land) due to the people's love for him.

State relocation

Due to the instability during the rule of King You of Zhou, Duke Huan of Zheng consulted Taishi Bo (太史伯) on his opinions on state relocation. Duke Huan expressed that he wished to move the country to the west or to the Yangtze River Basin. Taishi Bo indicated that establishing a country in the west would not last long since the people of the west were avaricious and greedy, and that establishing a country in the Yangtze River Basin would be unfavourable for the country since the state of Chu was expanding in the south. In the end, Duke Huan listened to the advice of Taishi Bo and moved the country to the east of Luoyang, south of the Yellow River and the Ji River (濟水), and named it New Zheng (新鄭).

After relocating the country, other nearby states such as the state of Kuai (鄶) and Guo offered Duke Huan ten cities, which were incorporated into the land of his country.

Death

In 771 BC, the 45th of his reign, the Quanrong attacked the Zhou capital Haojing and killed both King You of Zhou and Duke Huan of Zheng. His son, Juetu (掘突) assumed the throne as Duke Wu of Zheng.

See also
Family tree of ancient Chinese emperors

771 BC deaths
9th-century BC Chinese monarchs
8th-century BC Chinese monarchs
Zhou dynasty nobility
Year of birth unknown
Zheng (state)
Founding monarchs